The Portuguese Albums Chart ranks the best-performing albums in Portugal, as compiled by the Associação Fonográfica Portuguesa.

References 

1995 in Portugal
1995 record charts
Portuguese record charts